Sepedon is a genus of flies in the family Sciomyzidae, the marsh flies or snail-killing flies.

Species
Subgenus Mesosepedon Verbeke, 1950
S. convergens Loew, 1862
S. dispersa Verbeke, 1950
S. ethiopica Steyskal, 1956
S. pleuritica Loew, 1862
S. schoutedeni Verbeke, 1950
S. tuckeri Barraclough, 1985
Subgenus Parasepedon Verbeke, 1950
S. acrosticta Verbeke, 1956
S. albocostata Verbeke, 1950
S. edwardsi Steyskal, 1956
S. iris Verbeke, 1961
S. ituriensis Verbeke, 1950
S. katangensis Verbeke, 1950
S. knutsoni Vala, Gbedjissi & Dossou, 1994
S. lippensi Verbeke, 1950
S. maculifemur Verbeke, 1950
S. madecassa Verbeke, 1961
S. magerae Verbeke, 1950
S. monacha Verbeke, 1961
S. nanoides Verbeke, 1950
S. neavei Steyskal, 1956
S. notambe Speiser, 1910
S. ochripes Verbeke, 1950
S. ophiolimnes Steyskal, 1956
S. ornatifrons Adams, 1905
S. paranana Verbeke, 1950
S. pelex Steyskal, 1956
S. ruficeps Becker, 1922
S. saegeri Verbeke, 1950
S. scapularis Adams, 1903
S. selenopa Verbeke, 1961
S. senegalensis Macquart, 1843
S. simulans Verbeke, 1950
S. straeleni Verbeke, 1963
S. stuckenbergi Verbeke, 1961
S. testacea Loew, 1862
S. trichooscelis Speiser, 1910
S. trochanterina Verbeke, 1950
S. uelensis Verbeke, 1950
S. violacea Hendel, 1909
Subgenus Sepedomyia Verbeke, 1950
S. nasuta Verbeke, 1950
Subgenus Sepedon Latreille, 1804
S. aenescens Wiedemann, 1830
S. sphegea (Fabricius, 1775)
S. spinipes (Scopoli, 1763)
Unplaced 
S. americana Steyskal, 1951
S. anchista Steyskal, 1956
S. armipes Loew, 1859
S. batjanensis Brunetti, 1907
S. bifida Steyskal, 1951
S. borealis Steyskal, 1951
S. capellei Fisher & Orth, 1969
S. cascadensis Fisher & Orth, 1974
S. chalybeifrons Meijere, 1908
S. costalis Walker, 1858
S. crishna Walker, 1849
S. femorata Knutson & Orth, 1984
S. ferruginosa Wiedemann, 1824
S. floridensis Steyskal, 1951
S. fuscipennis Loew, 1859
S. gracilicornis Orth, 1986
S. hecate Elberg, Rozkošný & Knutson, 2009
S. hispanica Loew, 1862
S. lata Bezzi, 1928
S. lobifera Hendel, 1911
S. mcphersoni Knutson & Orth, 2001
S. melanderi Steyskal, 1951
S. neanias Hendel, 1913
S. neili Steyskal, 1951
S. noteoi Steyskal, 1980
S. pacifica Cresson, 1914
S. plumbella Wiedemann, 1830
S. praemiosa Giglio-Tos, 1893
S. pseudarmipes Fisher & Orth, 1969
S. pusilla Loew, 1859
S. relicta Wulp, 1897
S. senex Wiedemann, 1830
S. spangleri Beaver, 1974
S. tenuicornis Cresson, 1920

References

Sciomyzidae
Taxa named by Pierre André Latreille
Sciomyzoidea genera